Southbrook is a rural town and locality in the Toowoomba Region, Queensland, Australia.

Geography
Southbrook is north-east of Pittsworth on the Darling Downs. The Gore Highway passes through the north of the town.

History 
Previously under a pastoral run, the area was further developed in the 1880s when it was used for dairying and cropping.

Southbrook later became a stop on the Millmerran railway line.

Eton Vale State School opened on 5 August 1878. In 1888 it was renamed Umbirom State School. In 1909 it was renamed Harelmar State School. It closed on 14 December 1962. It was at 29 Old School Lane.

Southbrook Provisional School opened on 11 September 1882. On 15 February 1886, it became Southbrook State School. It closed on 1948. It was on Jimna Springs Road.

Harrow State School opened on 24 June 1909. It closed in 1927. It was on the western corner of Umbiram Banchory Road and Cambooya Felton Road (approx ). 

Elville State School opened on 31 October 1910 with an initial 35 students. The school named after the site it was built on. Circa 1916 it was renamed Southbrook Central State School. In 2010 the school celebrated its centenary.

St Mary’s Anglican Church was dedicated on 30 July 1904 by Venerable A.E. David, Archdeacon of Brisbane. It closed on 12 May 1996. Its closure was approved by Assistant Bishop Wood.

Beauaraba Provisional School opened on 1 January 1919. On 1 Oct 1920 it became Beauaraba State School. It closed on 24 March 1940.

During early settlement the town had a store, a hotel, and two cheese factories.

Education 
Southbrook Central State School is a government primary (Prep-6) school for boys and girls at 1 School Road. In 2017, the school had an enrolment of 67 students with 5 teachers (4 full-time equivalent) and 8 non-teaching staff (3 full-time equivalent).

Infrastructure 
Southbrook was connected to the National Broadband Network in 2014, joining places such as Clifton, Highfields, Oakey, and Pittsworth as the rollout moves to outer Toowoomba regions.

Attractions 

Prestbury Farmstay offers visitors the chance to experience country life firsthand. Activities include bushwalking, campfires, cycling, fishing, 4WD farm tours, swimming, and tennis. The picturesque countryside and natural wildlife are also a regular feature at Prestbury.

References

External links

 
 Town map of Southbrook, 1984

Towns in the Darling Downs
Toowoomba Region
Localities in Queensland